Common names: Great Lakes bush viper, Nitsche's bush viper,Mallow D, Ludwig D, Nilson G (2003). True Vipers: Natural History and Toxinology of Old World Vipers. Malabar, Florida: Krieger Publishing Company. 359 pp. . more.

Atheris nitschei is a species of  venomous snake, a viper in the subfamily Viperinae of the family Viperidae. The species is native to Africa. There are no subspecies that are recognized as being valid.

Taxonomy
The former subspecies Atheris nitschei rungweensis from southwestern Tanzania, northeastern Zambia and northern Malawi was elevated to species rank (Atheris rungweensis).

Etymology
The specific name, nitschei, is in honor of German zoologist Hinrich Nitsche (1845–1902).

The 1906 junior synonym, A. woosnami, was in honor of Kenyan game ranger Richard Bowen Woosnam (1880–1915), who later fought in World War I and was killed in action at Gallipoli.

Description

The males are smaller than the females.

Common names
Common names for A. nitschei include Great Lakes bush viper, Nitsche's bush viper, black and green bush viper, Nitsche's tree viper. sedge viper, green viper, bush viper.

Geographic range
Atheris nitschel is found in forests of the Central African Albertine Rift, in southern and eastern DR Congo, Uganda, western Tanzania, Rwanda, Burundi, and Zambia.

The type locality is listed as "Mpororosumpf, Deutsch-Ost-Afrika" [Mpororo swamp, Tanzania-Rwanda border].

Habitat
Preferred habitats of A. nitschei are wetland and meadow areas, and elephant grass marshes, along small streams, sometimes in scrub and bush in valleys at higher elevations, and in mountain forests up to the bamboo zone at  altitude. It is common in papyrus reed around small lakes.

Venom
Atheris nitschi has highly toxic venom like others in the Atheris genus. Not much is known about their venom but envenomation has caused severe bleeding and hemorrhaging.

Reproduction
A. nitschei is viviparous.

References

Further reading
Broadley DG (1998). "A review of the genus Atheris Cope (Serpentes: Viperidae), with the description of a new species from Uganda". Herpetological Journal 8 (3): 117–135. (Atheris nitschei, pp. 121–122, Figure 2).
Spawls S, Howell K, Hinkel H, Menegon M (2018). Field Guide to East African Reptiles, Second Edition. London: Bloomsbury Natural History. 624 pp. . (Atheris nitschei, p. 591).
Tornier G (1902). "Herpetologisch Neues aus Deutsch-Ost-Afrika ". Zoologische Jahrbücher. Abtheilung für Systemaik, Geographie und Biologie der Thiere (Jena) 15: 578–590. (Atheris nitschei, new species, pp. 589–590). (in German).

External links

 Accessed 29 October 2006.

nitschei
Snakes of Africa
Vertebrates of Burundi
Reptiles of the Democratic Republic of the Congo
Reptiles of Malawi
Reptiles of Mozambique 
Vertebrates of Rwanda
Reptiles of Tanzania
Reptiles of Uganda
Reptiles of Zambia
Taxa named by Gustav Tornier
Reptiles described in 1902